Prostamides are a class of physiologically active, lipid-like substances chemically related to prostaglandins. They occur naturally in humans and other animals. The first prostamide, called prostamide E2, was discovered in 1997.

Biochemistry

Prostamides are synthesized in the body from anandamide, which is the ethanolamide of arachidonic acid (ARA). This pathway is parallel to the synthesis of prostaglandins from ARA itself. The enzymes involved are at least partly the same as those responsible for prostaglandin synthesis.

It is thought that prostamides act via a specific receptor (or several receptors) which is distinct from the prostaglandin receptors. No such receptor has been identified .

Nomenclature
The names of prostamides are derived from the corresponding prostaglandin. For example, prostamide E2 is the ethanolamide of prostaglandin E2 (dinoprostone).

Clinical significance
The anti-glaucoma drug bimatoprost is a derivative of prostamide F2α, and is thought to have the same mechanism of action.

References

Prostaglandins